Njaan Njaan Maathram is a 1979 Indian Malayalam-language film,  directed by I. V. Sasi and produced by M. O. Joseph. The film stars Madhu, Sheela, Jose and Jayabharathi  in the lead roles. The film has musical score by G. Devarajan.

Cast

Madhu as Chandhran Pilla
Jayabharathi as Devu
Jose as
Sankaradi
Aranmula Ponnamma
Bahadoor
Kuthiravattam Pappu
M. G. Soman
N. Govindankutty
Seema as Jaanu
Sheela as Soudamini

Soundtrack
The music was composed by G. Devarajan and the lyrics were written by P. Bhaskaran.

References

External links
 

1978 films
1970s Malayalam-language films
Films directed by I. V. Sasi
Films with screenplays by Thoppil Bhasi